Vanlandi or Vanlande (Old Norse "Man from the Land of the Vanir") according to mythology was a Swedish king at Uppsala of the House of Yngling in Norse mythology. He was the son of Sveigðir whom he succeeded as king. He married a girl from Finnland, but forgot about her. In revenge, the girl arranged so that Vanlandi was hag ridden to death. He was succeeded by his son Visbur.

Attestations
Snorri Sturluson wrote of Vanlandi in his Ynglinga saga (1225) (note that the translator has rendered Finnland as Finland):

Snorri also quoted some lines from Ynglingatal composed in the 9th century:

The Historia Norwegiæ presents a Latin summary of Ynglingatal, older than Snorri's quotation:

The even earlier source Íslendingabók cites the line of descent in Ynglingatal and also gives Vanlandi as the successor of Svegðir and the predecessor of Visbur: v Svegðir. vi Vanlandi. vii Visburr. viii Dómaldr.

Geography
Geographical note: According to the article Skuttunge in Nationalencyklopedin, the creek skutá passed its name onto the village of Skuttunge and the parish of Skuttunge (sv). The area does not only contain raised stones, but also 45 grave fields (most from the Iron Age), including a dolmen. The creek is today named after the village.

The area has undergone considerable Post-glacial rebound. Rising about 0.5 m each 100 years. This has significantly changed the position of the seashore, lakes, rivers and human settlements over time.

Notes

References
McKinnell, John (2005). Meeting the Other in Norse Myth and Legend. DS Brewer.

Sources
Ynglingatal
Ynglinga saga (part of the Heimskringla)
Historia Norwegiae

Mythological kings of Sweden
Witchcraft in Sweden